Biing Hwang "Fred" Juang (Chinese name: 莊炳湟) is a communication and information scientist, best known for his work in speech coding, speech recognition and acoustic signal processing. He joined Georgia Institute of Technology in 2002 as Motorola Foundation Chair Professor in the School of Electrical & Computer Engineering.

In 2004, he was elected a member of the National Academy of Engineering for contributions to speech coding and speech recognition.

Life and career 
He earned his education at University of California, Santa Barbara. He did research on vocal tract modeling at Speech Communications Research Laboratory (SCRL) with Hisashi Wakita and then joined Signal Technology, Inc. (STI) in 1979, while still a Ph.D. student at UCSB (Advisor: A.H. Gray, Jr.), to work on a number of Government-sponsored research projects. In 1982, he moved to the U.S. east coast to join Bell Laboratories. His work includes development of vector quantization for voice applications, voice coders at extremely low bit rates (800 bit/s and 300 bit/s), robust vocoders for satellite communications, fundamental algorithms in signal modeling for automatic speech recognition, hidden Markov models, segmental clustering algorithms, discriminative methods in pattern recognition and machine learning, stereo- and multi-phonic teleconferencing, and a number of voice-enabled interactive communication services. Aside from various algorithms that are in widespread use today, he is also accredited with the conceptual breakthrough of direct error minimization for pattern recognition, which substantially augments the century-old methodology of Thomas Bayes' distribution estimation approach. He was Director of Acoustics and Speech Research at Bell Labs in late 1990s. He joined Georgia Tech in 2002.

Awards and recognitions
 Distinguished Alumni Award, National Taiwan University, November 2020
 Research Excellence Award, The Pan Wen Yuan Foundation, 2017.
 IEEE Field Award, James L. Flanagan Medal in Speech and Audio Processing, 2014 
 Charter Fellow, National Academy of Inventors, 2013
 Outstanding Technical Achievement Award, Chinese Institute of Engineers, 2007
 Elected Academician, Academia Sinica, 2006
 Elected Member, National Academy of Engineering (NAE), 2004
 Bell Labs Fellow, 1999 
 Fellow, IEEE, 1991
 Technical Achievement Award, IEEE Signal Processing Society, 1998 
 Third Millennium Medal, IEEE, 2000, for contributions to the field of speech processing and communications 
 Editor-in-Chief, IEEE Transactions on Speech and Audio Processing, 1996–2002 
 Distinguished Lecturer, IEEE Signal Processing Society, 1999

Recent publications 
 Digital Speech Processing, B. H. Juang, M. M. Sondhi, and L. R. Rabiner, Encyclopedia of Physical Science and Technology, Third Edition, Volume 4, pp. 485–500, 2002.

References

External links 

 ece.gatech.edu

21st-century American engineers
Georgia Tech faculty
Fellow Members of the IEEE
Members of the United States National Academy of Engineering